Marjorie Diane Blasius Corcoran (1950 – February 3, 2017) was an American particle physicist who worked as a professor at Rice University.

Biography
Born as Marjorie Blasius, she grew up in Beavercreek, Ohio, and was 1968 co-valedictorian of Beavercreek High School.
She earned a bachelor's degree in physics in 1972 from the University of Dayton, graduating summa cum laude,
and in the same year married Christopher Corcoran, taking his surname.  As a graduate student at Indiana University Bloomington, she began doing high-energy physics research at Fermilab. Her 1977 doctoral dissertation, Measurement of the polarization parameter in proton-proton elastic scattering for beam momenta ranging from 20 GeV/c to 200 GeV/c, was supervised by Homer Neal. She joined the Rice University faculty in 1980.

She died while bicycling on February 3, 2017 in Houston, from a collision with a METRORail train.

Contributions
As a professor at Rice, Corcoran continued her work at Fermilab as part of several large collaborative physics projects
including the D0 experiment, KTeV collaboration, and muon-to-electron-conversion experiment.

She also worked in physics outreach activities that included founding the Houston QuarkNet Program for high school physics students and teachers, helping to found a Women in Physics Group at Rice, sending undergraduates to physics conferences, and otherwise encouraging other women to participate in physics.

Awards and honors
In 1992, the American Physical Society (APS) named her as a fellow "for contributions to experiments studying spin asymmetries in hadronic collision". In 2015, the APS listed her as their January 2015 Woman of the Month.

References

1950 births
2017 deaths
People from Beavercreek, Ohio
American physicists
American women physicists
Particle physicists
University of Dayton alumni
Indiana University Bloomington alumni
Rice University faculty
Railway accident deaths in the United States
Fellows of the American Physical Society
American women academics
21st-century American women